Guide Right is an American musical variety show which aired on the DuMont Television Network from February 25, 1952, to February 5, 1954. 

The program was produced by the First Army Recruiting Service and supplied by the United States Air Force as a means of increasing enlistment for the Korean War. It featured The Airmen of Note directed by Fred Kepner, each 30-minute episode was hosted by Donn Russell, with Elliot Lawrence conducting the orchestra.

The show featured civilian musical artists in addition to military personnel. Guest performers included Eddie Fisher, June Valli, Sunny Gale, Teresa Brewer and Steve Lawrence.

Episode status
The UCLA Film and Television Archive has 18 episodes in its collection, and the Paley Center for Media has two episodes.

See also
List of programs broadcast by the DuMont Television Network
List of surviving DuMont Television Network broadcasts

References

Bibliography
David Weinstein, The Forgotten Network: DuMont and the Birth of American Television (Philadelphia: Temple University Press, 2004) 
Alex McNeil, Total Television, Fourth edition (New York: Penguin Books, 1980) 
Tim Brooks and Earle Marsh, The Complete Directory to Prime Time Network TV Shows, Third edition (New York: Ballantine Books, 1964)

External links
 
 DuMont historical website

1952 American television series debuts
1954 American television series endings
1950s American variety television series
Black-and-white American television shows
DuMont Television Network original programming
English-language television shows
United States Air Force